Bradina haplomorpha is a moth in the family Crambidae. It was described by Edward Meyrick in 1932. It is found on Fiji.

References

Moths described in 1932
Bradina